Geiger Covered Bridge is a historic wooden covered bridge located at North Whitehall Township, Lehigh County, Pennsylvania. It has vertical plank siding and an entry portal of stepped square planks. It crosses Jordan Creek.

It was listed on the National Register of Historic Places in 1980.

References 

Covered bridges in Lehigh County, Pennsylvania
Bridges in Lehigh County, Pennsylvania
Bridges completed in 1860
Covered bridges on the National Register of Historic Places in Pennsylvania
Wooden bridges in Pennsylvania
History of Lehigh County, Pennsylvania
Tourist attractions in Lehigh County, Pennsylvania
National Register of Historic Places in Lehigh County, Pennsylvania
Road bridges on the National Register of Historic Places in Pennsylvania
Burr Truss bridges in the United States
1860 establishments in Pennsylvania